Stena Nordica is a ro-pax ferry owned and operated by Stena Line.

History
Stena Nordica was originally built European Ambassador for P&O Irish Sea. She initially entered service between Liverpool and Dublin. Soon after she was used on the new Mostyn - Dublin service. She opened a direct Dublin – Cherbourg route making one round trip at the weekend, with a call to Rosslare outbound in the winter.  In 2004, she transferred to Stena Line  with P&O's Fleetwood – Larne and Dublin – Mostyn vessels. The Dublin - Mostyn and Dublin - Cherbourg routes were closed following the Stena Line takeover.

Following the closure of the Mostyn service, she was sold to Stena Line in 2004. The European Ambassador sailed for Scandinavia and was renamed the Stena Nordica. She entered service between Karlskrona - Gdynia where she increased her capacity significantly. After a major refit including the fitting of new ramps to speed up loading and unloading, the ship entered service under the Swedish flag in May 2004. She returned to Dublin as a relief ship in January 2008, when she arrived from Fishguard and Rosslare, where she had conducted berthing trials. After trials in Dublin, she then sailed to Holyhead to take up the roster covering the Stena Seatrader's refit. She then covered the MS Stena Europe's refit and returned to the Baltic in February.

In October 2008 it was announced that the Stena Nordica would be returning to the Irish Sea replacing the Stena Seatrader and increasing capacity between Dublin and Holyhead. In March 2009 the Stena Nordica received a £2 Million refit which improved passenger areas and brought the vessel into line with the rest of the Irish sea fleet.

In 2014 Stena Line took possession of Dieppe Seaways, at the end of its charter to DFDS Seaways, who used the ship on the Dover - Calais route. After refit and they intend to introduce the ship as MS Stena Superfast X in 2015 on their Holyhead - Dublin service. In January 2015, it was announced that DFDS Seaways had chartered Stena Nordica to be the replacement running mate on their Calais route, effectively performing a ship swap.

In summer 2016, she was briefly chartered to Grandi Navi Veloci to sail on numerous Genoa services, one of which was from Genoa to Termini Imerese. She was returned to Stena by the end of the year. From her return from the GNV charter, she continues to be used by Stena as a cover vessel, and hence she never really had a consistent service on one route, frequently switching routes generally every few months for refit cover or any other reason. 

References

Ferries of the Republic of Ireland
Ferries of Wales
2000 ships
Nordica 2000
Ships built by Mitsubishi Heavy Industries